Pradison Mariyadasan (born 28 January 1998) is an Indian professional footballer who plays as a defender for Sudeva Delhi in the I-League.

Career
Pradison made his professional debut for the Chennai City against TRAU on 1 December 2019, He started and played till 82nd minute as Chennai City won 1–0.

Career statistics

Club

References

1998 births
Living people
People from Nagercoil
Indian footballers
Chennai City FC players
Footballers from Tamil Nadu
I-League players
Association football defenders
Sudeva Delhi FC players